Abdeljalil Hadda (born 23 March 1972), sometimes nicknamed Kamatcho, is a Moroccan retired footballer who played as a striker.

Club career
Born in Meknes, Hadda started playing for local CODM, moving to Saudi Arabia for Ittihad in 1996. After a spell in Tunisia he signed with Real Sporting de Gijón in Spain, going on to appear irregularly for the Asturias side in Segunda División and also being loaned to Yokohama F. Marinos.

Released by Real Sporting in 2001, Kamatcho returned to Club Africain for one more season, then moved back to his country, where he retired two years later at the age of 32.

International career
A Morocco international on 41 occasions (19 goals), Hadda appeared for the country at the 1998 FIFA World Cup, where he scored twice in three games in an eventual group stage exit. He also participated in the 1998 and 2000 African Cup of Nations.

Career statistics

International

Scores and results list Morocco's goal tally first, score column indicates score after each Hadda goal.

References

External links

1972 births
Living people
People from Meknes
Moroccan footballers
Association football forwards
Botola players
COD Meknès players
Maghreb de Fès players
Ittihad FC players
Club Africain players
Segunda División players
Sporting de Gijón players
J1 League players
Yokohama F. Marinos players
Morocco international footballers
1998 FIFA World Cup players
1998 African Cup of Nations players
2000 African Cup of Nations players
2002 African Cup of Nations players
Moroccan expatriate footballers
Expatriate footballers in Saudi Arabia
Expatriate footballers in Tunisia
Expatriate footballers in Spain
Expatriate footballers in Japan
Moroccan expatriate sportspeople in Saudi Arabia
Moroccan expatriate sportspeople in Tunisia
Moroccan expatriate sportspeople in Spain